Wagenfelder Aue is a river of Lower Saxony, Germany, a right tributary of the Hunte.

It drains a large area of marshland.

The river rises south of the centre of Wagenfeld and flows northwards through the town, forming the border between the Samtgemeindes (collective municipalities) of Barnstorf and Rehden before discharging into the Hunte south of Barnstorf.

See also
List of rivers of Lower Saxony

References

Rivers of Lower Saxony
Rivers of Germany